Marivka is an urban-type settlement in Nikopol Raion of Dnipropetrovsk Oblast in Ukraine. It is located on the right bank of the Dnieper (Kakhovka Reservoir), opposite to the city of Enerhodar and upstream of the city of Nikopol. Marivka belongs to Marhanets urban hromada, one of the hromadas of Ukraine. Population: 

Until 18 July 2020, Marivka belonged to Marhanets Municipality, the administrative division subordinated to the city of oblast significance of Marhanets. The municipality was abolished in July 2020 as part of the administrative reform of Ukraine, which reduced the number of raions of Dnipropetrovsk Oblast to seven. The area of Marhanets Municipality was merged into Nikopol Raion.

Economy

Transportation
The closest railway station is in Marhanets, on a railway connecting Zaporizhzhia with Kryvyi Rih.

Marivka is connected by road with Marhanets, where there is access to Highway H23 to Zaporizhia and Kryvyi Rih. In the opposite direction, the road follows the bank of the Dnieper and eventually to Tomakivka.

References

Urban-type settlements in Nikopol Raion
Nikopol Raion